Allwork tractors were manufactured by the Electric Wheel Company of Quincy, Illinois.  
Electric Wheel Co. was acquired by the Firestone Tire and Rubber Company. The All Work II Model F was a lightweight tractor with a big surplus of power for general farming and orchard work. This tractor was fueled by kerosene.

Allwork 14-28

Manufacturer................................Electric Wheel Co Quincy Illinois
Nebraska test number........................53
Test date...................................August 16-September 14, 1920
Test tractor serial number..................5043
Years produced .............................1918-1923
Engine......................................Electric Wheel Co. vertical L-head
Cylinders...................................4
Bore and stroke (inches)....................5.00x6.00
Rated rpm...................................900
Displacement (c.i.).........................471.3
Fuel........................................kerosine/gasoline
Fuel tank capacity (gallons)................25
Auxiliary tank capacity (gallons)...........5
Carburetor..................................Kingston E
Air cleaner.................................Bennett
Ignition....................................Kingston L magneto
Cooling capacity (gallons)..................13

Maximum brake horsepower tests
PTO/belt horsepower........................28.86
Crankshaft rpm.............................915
Fuel use (gallons per hour)................4.95

Maximum drawbar horsepower tests
Gear.......................................low
Drawbar horsepower.........................19.69
Pull weight (pounds).......................3,950
Speed......................................1.87
Percent slippage...........................15.10
SAE drawbar horsepower.....................14
SAE belt/PTO horsepower....................28
Type.......................................4
Front wheel (inches).......................steel: 32x6
Rear wheel (inches)........................steel: 48x12
Length (inches)............................125
Height (inches)............................69
Rear width (inches)........................79
Weight (pounds)............................5,000
Gear/speed (miles per hour)................forward: 1/1.75, 2/2.50; reverse 1/1.75

References
 Ultimate American Farm Tractor Data Book  Lorry Dunning First published by MBI Publishing Company, 729 Prospect Avenue PO Box 1 Osceola, WI 54020-0001 USA
http://www.flywheelers.com/pages/craig/mypics/Quincy%20All%20Work.jpg
http://www.farmcollector.com/equipment/electric-wheel-co.aspx

Tractors